The 2023 Pac-12 Conference softball tournament will be held from May 10 through May 13, 2023 at Rita Hillenbrand Memorial Stadium in Tucson, Arizona.  This will mark the first postseason championship event sponsored by the Pac-12 Conference since 1978, the first to feature more than two teams. The nine team, single-elimination tournament winner will earn the league's automatic bid to the 2023 NCAA Division I softball tournament.

Seeds
This tournament will feature 9 teams in this conference (Colorado, USC & Washington State do no field team).  Teams will play once per day at the 2023 Pac-12 Softball Championship. The four-day event will begin with a play-in game between the eighth and ninth-place teams in the regular-season standings. That winner will advance to an eight-team, single-elimination bracket with the quarterfinals, semifinals and championship being contested on the following three days. The winner of the Pac-12 Softball Championship will receive the Conference's automatic bid to the NCAA tournament.  The seedings will be determined upon completion of regular season play. The winning percentage of the teams in conference play will determine tournament seedings. There are tiebreakers in place to seed teams with identical conference records.

Bracket

Schedule
2023 Bracket

All-tournament Team
The following players will be members of the 2022 Pac-12 Softball All-Tournament Team.  Player in Bold selected as Tournament MVP.

References

Tournament
Pac-12 Conference softball tournament
Pac-12